Pizzi is a surname of Italian origin. The name refers to:
Angelo Pizzi (1775–1819), Italian sculptor, active in a Neoclassical style
Becca Pizzi (born 1980), American marathon runner
Carlo Pizzi (1842–1909), Italian painter
Claudio E.A. Pizzi (born 1944), Italian philosopher
Emilio Pizzi (1862–1940), Italian composer
Fausto Pizzi (born 1967), Italian footballer
Francesco Pizzi (born 2004), Italian racing driver
Gabrielle Pizzi (1940–2004), Australian art dealer
Italo Pizzi (1849–1920), Italian academic and scholar of Persian language and literature
Juan Antonio Pizzi (born 1968), association football player and manager
Nilla Pizzi (1919–2011), Italian singer
Pier Luigi Pizzi (born 1930), Italian opera director and designer
Ray Pizzi, nicknamed "Pizza Man" (born 1943), American jazz saxophonist, bassoonist, and flautist
Pizzi (Portuguese footballer), real name Luís Miguel Afonso Fernandes (born 1989), Portugal international footballer